Odenplan station is a station on both the Green Line of the Stockholm Metro and the City Line of the Pendeltåg commuter rail network. It is located at Odenplan in Vasastaden, in Stockholm city centre.

The station was inaugurated on 26 October 1952 as a part of the stretch of the Metro between Hötorget and Vällingby. It was significantly expanded in July 2017, with the opening of the City Line that provided a dedicated north-south route for the Pendeltåg, serving Odenplan on the way. Besides the new tunnels and platforms for the City Line, new station entrances were constructed, supplementing those built for the Metro.

The station has two underground island platforms at different levels and on different alignments, with the City Line platforms at the lower level. It has entrances on Odenplan itself, on the north side of Karlbergsvägen opposite Odenplan, at the junction of Karlbergsvägen with Västmannagatan, and at the junction of Vanadisvägen with Dalagaten. The first two entrances provide direct access to both sets of platforms, whilst the Västmannagatan entrance provides direct access to the Metro platforms and Vanadisvägen to the City Line platforms. However both sets of platforms are connected by interchange passages, so it is possible to reach any platform from any entrance. Unlike the Metro platforms, the City Line platforms have platform screen doors.

The other long side bends gently inwards where stairwells form seats towards the square in the best sun position. The entrance building has five entrances and leads via escalators, ordinary stairs and an elevator down to the new ticket hall. Nearby is a new bicycle garage with a capacity of 350 bicycles.

Future plans include a diversion of the Roslagsbanan narrow-gauge commuter railway in tunnel from Universitetet station via Odenplan to a terminus at T-Centralen.

The station is 3.4 km from Slussen.

Gallery

References

External links
Plan of station (pdf)
Piano stairs at Odenplan
Images of Odenplan

Green line (Stockholm metro) stations
Railway stations opened in 1952
Stockholm City Line